The term red flag could mean either a literal flag used for signaling or, as a metaphor, a sign of some particular problem requiring attention.

Background

The term and the expression "to raise the red flag" come from various usages of real flags throughout history. A red flag is frequently flown by armed forces to warn the public of live fire exercises in progress, and is sometimes flown by ships carrying munitions (in this context it is actually the flag for the letter B in the international maritime signal flag alphabet, a red swallow-tailed flag). In many countries a red flag is flown to signify that an outdoor shooting range is in use. The United States Air Force refers to its largest annual exercise as Red Flag operation. Red flags are used for various signals in team sailing races (see Racing Rules of Sailing). A red flag warning is a signal of high wildfire danger, and a red flag on the beach warns of dangerous water conditions (double red flags indicate beach closure). Red flags of various designs indicate dangerous wind and wave conditions for mariners. In auto racing, a red flag indicates that a race has been stopped.

A signal of danger or a problem can be referred to as a red flag, a usage that originated in the 18th century. An infamous example of use of a red flag in warfare is Mexican General Antonio López de Santa Anna's use of the symbol to let his Texian opposition in the Alamo know that he intended to spare none of the defenders (on which he followed through). The term "red flag" is used, e.g., during screening of communications, and refers to specific words or phrases encountered that might indicate relevance to the case. For example, email spam filters make use of such "red flags".

See also
 Red flag (racing) 
 Red Flags Rule

References

Communication
Flag (idiom), red